Nachingwea Airport  is a domestic airport locate in south Lindi Region, Tanzania. The airport serves the town Nachingwea. It is on the northeast side of the town.

See also

 List of airports in Tanzania
 Transport in Tanzania

References

External links
OpenStreetMap - Nachingwea
OurAirports - Nachingwea Airport
SkyVector - Nachingwea

Airports in Tanzania
Buildings and structures in the Lindi Region